Iván vitéz Hindy de Kishind or vitéz kishindi Hindy Iván (28 June 1890, Budapest – 29 August 1946, Budapest) was an officer in the Royal Hungarian Army during World War II.

Colonel-General Hindy commanded the Hungarian I Corps from 16 October 1944 to 12 February 1945.

From 29 December 1944, Hindy also commanded the Hungarian defenders of Budapest during the Siege of Budapest. On 11 February 1945, Hindy was captured by the Soviets trying to escape just prior to the fall of the city on 13 February. The commander of the German defenders of Budapest, Waffen SS General Karl Pfeffer-Wildenbruch, orchestrated the breakout attempt and was also captured.

Hindy was sentenced to death after the war. In 1946, he was executed by firing squad.

Command history
 President, Military Courts and Court of Honor - 1940 to 1942
 General Officer Commanding, I Corps, Eastern Front and Budapest - 1944 to 1945
 Prisoner of war - 1945 to 1946
 Condemned to death and executed - 1946

References

1890 births
1946 deaths
Military personnel from Budapest
Hungarian military personnel of World War II
Hungarian soldiers
Executed Hungarian collaborators with Nazi Germany
People executed by Hungary by firing squad
World War II prisoners of war held by the Soviet Union
Hungarian prisoners of war